These are the official results of the Women's 100 metres hurdles event at the 1982 European Championships in Athens, Greece, held at Olympic Stadium "Spiros Louis" on 9 September 1982.

Medalists

Results

Final
9 September
Wind: 0.4 m/s

Heats
9 September

Heat 1
Wind: 1.5 m/s

Heat 2
Wind: 0.6 m/s

Participation
According to an unofficial count, 16 athletes from 9 countries participated in the event.

 (2)
 (3)
 (3)
 (1)
 (1)
 (1)
 (3)
 (1)
 (1)

See also
 1978 European World Championships 100m Hurdles (Prague)
 1980 Women's Olympic 100m Hurdles (Moscow)
 1983 Women's World Championships 100m Hurdles (Helsinki)
 1984 Women's Olympic 100m Hurdles (Los Angeles)
 1986 European World Championships 100m Hurdles (Stuttgart)
 1987 Women's World Championships 100m Hurdles (Rome)
 1988 Women's Olympic 100m Hurdles (Seoul)

References

 Results

100 metres hurdles
Sprint hurdles at the European Athletics Championships
1982 in women's athletics